Academica may refer to:

 Academica (charter school), a charter school operator in Florida
 Academica (library), the online interlibrary system of the National Library of Poland
 Associação Académica de Coimbra – O.A.F., a Portuguese association football team
 FC Academica Clinceni, a Romanian association football team
 Academica SC, an American soccer team
 Academica (Cicero), a work on Academic Skeptic philosophy by the Roman statesman and philosopher Cicero